Enson Kwok Shung Ngai (born 11 November 1999) is an Australian-born Hong Kong professional footballer who currently plays as a defender for Serbian First League club Mačva Šabac.

Club career
As a youth player, Kwok joined the youth academy of English side Boreham Wood.

In July 2021, he signed for Serbian First League club Timok. On 27 November 2021, he debuted for the club during a 2–0 win over Budućnost (Dobanovci).

On 6 July 2022, he signed for another Serbian First League club Mačva Šabac.

International career
Kwok is eligible to represent Hong Kong internationally and Australia internationally, having been born there.

References

External links
 

Living people
1999 births
Hong Kong footballers
Association football defenders
Serbian First League players
FK Timok players
FK Mačva Šabac players
Hong Kong expatriate footballers
Expatriate footballers in Serbia
Sportspeople from Brisbane
Australian people of Hong Kong descent